William C. Fouser (October, 1855 – March 1, 1919) was a Major League Baseball player.

Fouser was born and died in Philadelphia, Pennsylvania.  He was interred in Monument Cemetery.

References

External links

Major League Baseball second basemen
Philadelphia Athletics (NL) players
Baseball players from Philadelphia
Burials at Monument Cemetery
19th-century baseball players
1855 births
1919 deaths
Erie (minor league baseball) players
Buffalo (minor league baseball) players
Pittsburgh Allegheny players